The Speedcar Series Championship was a stock car racing series that was active from January 2008 to June 2009 across two championship seasons. Races were held across several countries, spanning the Middle East and Asia. It featured up to 24 drivers competing in identical V8 620 hp stock cars, deliberately lacking electronic driver aids. Its headquarters were situated at the Dubai Autodrome.

Former Formula One drivers Jacques Villeneuve, Jean Alesi, Heinz-Harald Frentzen, Christian Danner, Johnny Herbert, Stefan Johansson, Narain Karthikeyan, Ukyo Katayama, JJ Lehto, Gianni Morbidelli, Alex Yoong and Vitantonio Liuzzi competed in the Speedcar Series. Herbert and Morbidelli were the two series champions. MotoGP rider Marco Melandri also competed in several races.

As a result of cutbacks, the series' backer, Union Properties, withdrew its support. A rescue deal planned by new series boss Claudio Berro fell through, and the championship was cancelled in June 2009. The British Virgin Islands based company that ran the series was placed into liquidation on 14 June 2010 and its assets put up for sale.

Technical and sporting regulations

The series was a one-make series in that only one type of car was allowed. The car was the Speedcar V8, made by the championship promoter, powered by a V8 620 hp supplied by Menard Competition Technologies. The chassis has been updated for the 2008-09 season.

Vehicle Specifications
Chassis: Tubular frame with safety roll cage
Engine Displacement:  Pushrod V8
Transmission: 4 Speed Manual
Weight:  without driver and fuel
Power Output: 
Torque: 
Fuel: Unleaded gasoline
Fuel Capacity:  
Fuel Delivery: MoTeC Fuel Injection
Vehicle Wiring: MoTeC Systems East
Compression Ratio: 12:1
Wheelbase:  
Throttle Body Size: 750-830 cubic feet per minute (354-392 liters per second) 4 barrel
Aspiration: Naturally aspirated
Steering: Power, recirculating ball
Tires: Slick tires and rain tires provided by Michelin
Length: 
Width: 
Height: 
Safety equipment: HANS device, Seat belt 6-point supplied by MOMO

Event schedule

Speedcar events were held usually over two consecutive days, below the structure of the weekend.

Race day 1: 
Free practice (1 h)
Qualifying (30 min)
Race 1 (40 min)

Race day 2: 
Warm-up (20 min)
Race 2 (40 min)

The grid of race 2 was decided by the race 1 result with top 8 being reversed, so the driver who finished 8th have started from pole position and the winner have started from 8th place.

No refuelling was allowed during either race.

Points system

The series used the points scoring systems adopted at the time in the majority of the FIA championships.

Champions

References

External links

speedcarseries.com

 
Recurring sporting events established in 2008
Recurring sporting events disestablished in 2009
Defunct auto racing series